Ja-Ela Pradeshiya Sabha is a provincial council that governs towns such as Kandana, Ragama, Batuwatta and Ekala.

Members
The chairman of Ja-Ela Pradeshiya Sabha is Lalith Nishantha

References

Government of Gampaha District
Local authorities in Western Province, Sri Lanka